Russkiy Mir Foundation (literally "Russian World Foundation") was created by decree by Vladimir Putin in 2007, as a government-sponsored  organization aimed at promoting the Russian language and Russian culture worldwide, and "forming the Russian World as a global project", co-operating with the Russian Orthodox Church in promoting values that challenge the Western cultural tradition. The Foundation was modeled after similar culture promotion agencies, such as British Council and Goethe Institute.

The founders the Ministry of Foreign Affairs of the Russian Federation and the Ministry of Education and Science of the Russian Federation. The assets of the foundation come from the federal budget, voluntary property contributions and donations, and other legal sources.

The foundation made in 2011 an agreement with the University of São Paulo for founding the Laboratório de Estudos Russos (LERUSS).

Some observers described the foundation as an instrument for projecting the Russian state's soft power. Since the 2022 Russian invasion of Ukraine, the Russian world as a concept and its instruments have been associated with the Russian irredentism, imperialism and totalitarianism.

Sanctions 
In July 2022 the EU imposed sanctions on Russkiy Mir Foundation in relation to the 2022 Russian invasion of Ukraine.

References

External links
Official site
Pages for Ukraine

2007 establishments in Russia
Cultural promotion organizations
Foreign relations of Russia
Government agencies of Russia
Propaganda in Russia
Russian irredentism
Russian language
Russian nationalism